The Frederick L. and L. Frederick Gottschalk Houses are two historic houses in Columbus, Nebraska. The log house was built by Frederick Gottschalk and his wife, née Margaretha Loy Deuck, in 1857 on property they homesteaded. Gottschalk was an immigrant from Germany, and a co-founder of Columbus. The cabin is considered the oldest such structure in Nebraska.

Their son, L. Frederick Gottchalk, built a two-story house next to it in 1911; it was designed in the Colonial Revival style by architect Charles Wurdeman. 

The properties have been listed on the National Register of Historic Places since June 25, 1982. The log cabin has since been moved and is currently on display at the Platte County Historical Society museum, to which it was donated by a later owner of the property.

References

		
National Register of Historic Places in Platte County, Nebraska
Houses completed in 1857
1857 establishments in Nebraska Territory
Houses completed in 1911
Colonial Revival architecture in Nebraska